Jerry L. O'Connor (born September 14, 1953) is an American Republican politician and retired banker from Fond du Lac, Wisconsin.  He is a member of the Wisconsin State Assembly, representing Wisconsin's 52nd Assembly district since January 2023.  He was the president and C.E.O. of the National Exchange Bank & Trust of Waupun, Wisconsin, from 1998 until his retirement in 2020.

Biography
Jerry O'Connor was born in southwest Wisconsin and moved to Lomira, Wisconsin, during high school.  After graduating from high school, he attended Minnesota Bible College and went on to earn his master's degree from the Graduate School of Banking at the University of Wisconsin–Madison.

He subsequently moved to Fond du Lac, Wisconsin, which has been his primary residence ever since.  He had a 40 year career in banking, and was most recently the president and C.E.O. of the National Exchange Bank & Trust of Waupun, Wisconsin, retiring in 2020.  During his career, he was also chairman of the Community Bankers of Wisconsin and was co-chair of the board of the Wisconsin Bankers Association.

Political career
In December 2021, incumbent Wisconsin state representative Jeremy Thiesfeldt announced he would not seek a sixth term in the Assembly.  The following Spring, O'Connor announced that he would run for the Republican nomination to succeed Thiesfeldt in the 52nd Assembly district.  The district covers most of central Fond du Lac County and is safely Republican, and ultimately saw three other candidates enter the race for the Republican nomination.  O'Connor prevailed by a wide margin in the primary, taking 55% in the four-person contest.  He went on to win the general election with 62% of the vote.

He will take office in January 2023.

Personal life and family
Jerry O'Connor has six brothers.  He has been married twice.  He married his high school sweetheart, Amy Lansdowne, on August 26, 1972, in Madison, Wisconsin.  They had two daughters together and were married for nearly 43 years before she died of cancer in 2015.  He subsequently married Luanne Bohlman-Romuald, a widow and mother of three adult children.  Jerry and Luanne reside in the town of Fond du Lac, just outside the city of Fond du Lac.

Electoral history

Wisconsin Assembly (2022)

| colspan="6" style="text-align:center;background-color: #e9e9e9;"| Republican Primary, August 9, 2022

| colspan="6" style="text-align:center;background-color: #e9e9e9;"| General Election, November 8, 2022

References

External links
 Campaign website
 
 Jerry L. O'Connor at Wisconsin Vote

1953 births
Living people
Republican Party members of the Wisconsin State Assembly
People from Fond du Lac, Wisconsin
21st-century American politicians
American bank presidents